InterHarmony International School of Music is the first online classical music conservatory offering year-round classical music training programs, including private lessons on all musical instruments, Master Classes, recitals, classes in music theory, solfège, and other subjects to students of all ages and levels. The program was created by Russian-born, American cello soloist Misha Quint, who also founded the InterHarmony International Music Festival.

InterHaromony International Music Festival, one of the world's leading summer classical music festivals, was the impetus to founding of the InterHarmony International School of Music, to provide students with the option of studying in full programs without leaving the comfort and safety of their home. The programs aim for students to receive a balanced and intensive musical education virtually with professors who teach at prestigious universities around the world, are members of acclaimed orchestras, soloists, and chamber musicians. A goal of IIMS is for students from any city or country to have the opportunity to study with a desirable teacher worldwide virtually through video conferencing in private lessons and group classes, in order for students to have global exposure to instruction not always available in their local area. Students can choose either the Precollege (around age 8–13 years old), Young Artist (around age 14–17 years old), or Music Dilettante (age 18+) Programs.

Participants of the InterHarmony International School of Music programme will be automatically accepted to the InterHarmony International Music Festival in Italy and Germany if they wish to apply. Virtual students will have the opportunity to meet professors in person at the InterHarmony International Music Festival, where those who studied virtually will study actually. Students can gain access to masterclasses and workshops provided by the professors and may submit applications for the Inter Harmony International Competition with a winner's concert at Weill Recital Hall at Carnegie Hall.

Educational programs 
InterHarmony International School of Music offers young musicians a choice of the following programs of study:

 Precollege Program (Ages 8 – 13)
 Young Artist Program (Ages 14 – 17)
 Independent Artist Mastery Program (Ages 18+)
 Music InterMezzo Program (Ages 18+)

Instrument programs 

Double Bass 
Bassoon 
Cello 
Clarinet 
Composition 
Flute 
French horn 
Guitar 
Oboe
Piano 
Trumpet 
Trombone 
Tuba 
Viola 
Violin
Voice

See also 
List of pre-college music schools
Music schools in the United States

References

External links 

Music schools
Online schools